Chaz Beasley (born October 24, 1985) is an American attorney and politician in Charlotte, North Carolina. Beasley represented District 92 (part of Mecklenburg County) in the North Carolina House of Representatives and was elected to his first term on November 8, 2016.

Early life
Chaz Beasley was born in Statesville, North Carolina, and grew up in a low-income, single parent home.

Education
Beasley graduated as valedictorian of Newton-Conover High School in 2004, with high honors in economics from Harvard University in 2008, and from Georgetown Law School in 2013, during which time he also coached youth basketball at a small grade school.

Career
Currently an associate with the law firm of Moore & Van Allen, Beasley works in finance, focusing on capital markets transactions, representing financial institutions in corporate and structured debt financing. Before that, Beasley served on the staff of the United States Senate Majority Leader and as an employee of the law firm Alston & Bird. He also interned for judges on the United States Court of Appeals for the Fourth Circuit and the Supreme Court of North Carolina. During the financial crisis of 2008, he performed risk management in the residential mortgage industry.

Politics
Beasley has been elected twice (in 2016 and 2018) as a member of the North Carolina House of Representatives for District 92.

In 2019, he announced his candidacy for Lieutenant Governor of North Carolina in the 2020 election. Beasley tied for third place on March 3, 2020, with 18.86% of the vote.

In 2022, Governor Roy Cooper appointed Beasley to the State Board of Community Colleges.

Personal life
Beasley lives in the Steele Creek area of Charlotte.

Electoral history

2020

2018

2016

References

Hampton, Lacey. "Jeter, Beasley look to November election”, "The Herald", April 14, 2016.
Myrick, Susan. "The 21 North Carolina Races to Watch in 2016”, "Civitas Institute", January 11, 2016.

External links

Living people
1985 births
People from Statesville, North Carolina
People from Mecklenburg County, North Carolina
Georgetown University Law Center alumni
Harvard College alumni
North Carolina lawyers
21st-century American politicians
21st-century African-American politicians
African-American state legislators in North Carolina
Democratic Party members of the North Carolina House of Representatives